The 2010–11 season was the 109th season in the history of Norwich City. It was the club's first season back in the Football League Championship (second tier of the English football pyramid), following promotion from League One in 2009–10. Norwich finished as runners-up to Queens Park Rangers, confirming promotion to the Premier League in the penultimate match of the season with a 1–0 victory against Portsmouth at Fratton Park. Thus they became the first side since Manchester City in the 1999–2000 season to win successive promotions to the top flight. This article shows statistics and details of all matches played by the club during the season.

Board and staff members

Board members

Coaching staff

Statistics

Appearances, goals and cards
Last updated on 7 May 2011.
(Substitute appearances in brackets)

Captains
Accounts for all competitions. Last updated on 7 May 2011.

Top goalscorers
Lists at most top 10 goalscorers only. Players are ranked by the total number of goals scored. At the end of the season, players with one goal only and are in the top 10 should be classified according to most recently scored – the top 3 of these few will remain in the list.
Legend: LG = Championship; L. Cup = League CupClassification: 1. Goals in total 2. Goals in league 3. Goals in FA Cup 4. Goals in League Cup 5. Most recently scoredPenalties Awarded

PlayersUpdated 7 May 2011.First team squad

Out on loan

Transfers

In

Out

Loans in

Loans out

Competitions

Pre-seasonNote: this section relates to first team friendlies only.''

League

August

City got off to a bad start losing 3–2 to Watford who were expected to struggle over the season. However City would record their first league win of the season in the next game away at Scunthorpe. Grant Holt grabbed a last minute winner, something that became very common in City's season. Next up were Swansea and City won again with late goals in dramatic circumstances. After saving a penalty from Swansea, City would again win it late with an Ashley Williams o.g. and Simeon Jackson netting his first of the season, and City would then go onto grab a point away at Nottingham Forest with Andrew Crofts scoring his first goal for Norwich.

September

After a decent start to the season, City began September with a 2–1 win over Barnsley with an own goal and Chris Martin getting the victory, before City suffered their first away defeat of the season at the hands of Doncaster losing 3–1, James Coppinger scoring a hat-trick with Russell Martin grabbing a consolation. However Norwich bounced straight back with a 1–0 away win at Preston, Grant Holt grabbing only his second goal of the season. Norwich then faced a Hull side without an away win in 18 months and even though Norwich dominated the game for large parts Hull stole the victory with two late goals, however City immediately bounced back with a 4–3 win against Leicester, Andrew Crofts equalised for City after an early mistake from John Ruddy allowed Martyn Waghorn to give Leicester the lead. Wes Hoolahan scored two second half goals with Adam Drury himself getting his first goal in over four years.

October

Norwich began October still in the play-off positions and began with a 3–0 win away at Bristol City with Wes Hoolahan opening the scoring with a penalty before a Simeon Jackson double gave Norwich the victory. After two weeks off, City faced top of the league QPR who had yet to concede a goal at Loftus Road or drop a point, and Wes Hoolahan had the perfect opportunity to put City ahead but his penalty went wide. However City held on for a point, but in the following game City lost to their bogey side Crystal Palace in what would come to be their only away win of the season, Grant Holt gave City the lead in the first half before Palace would come back to win the game in the second half. City then faced Middlesbrough and scored a 1–0 win in a tight affair with Simeon Jackson scoring before half time, before City faced Cardiff away from home and lost 3–1.

November

Norwich looked to bounce back from their defeat at Cardiff a week later with the visit of Burnley to Carrow Road. The visitors tore Norwich apart in the first half taking a 2–0 lead into half-time. However City showed fighting spirit with Chris Martin reducing the deficit and Andrew Crofts getting an injury time equaliser. Norwich then faced fellow promoted side Millwall, City took the lead through a David Fox volley and looked to be heading for a victory before Millwall equalised with virtually the last kick of the game. Norwich were then frustrated at Reading, taking a 3–1 lead into half-time with Russell Martin, Grant Holt and Chris Martin scoring the goals. However Holt would be wrongly sent off before half-time and Reading got a 3–3 draw out of the game. Holt's ban for the card was overturned. City then faced fellow promotion contenders Leeds at Carrow Road and got a 1–1 draw with Leon Barnett scoring his first goal for the club in the second half. The next game was the East Anglian derby – Holt gave city the lead before Damien Delaney equalised. Holt then put City back in front before Delanay was sent off. Holt then sealed his hat-trick before Hoolahan quickly made it 4–1. City ended the month oback in the play-off places.

December

January

February

March

April

May

FA Cup

League Cup

Final league table

References

Norwich City F.C. seasons
Norwich City